Frank George Robertson (25 April 1882 – 1 November 1954) was an Australian rules footballer who played with St Kilda in the Victorian Football League (VFL).

Notes

External links 

1882 births
1954 deaths
Australian rules footballers from Victoria (Australia)
St Kilda Football Club players
Brighton Football Club players